Costanzo Zani, O.S.B. (1622–1694) was a Roman Catholic prelate who served as Bishop of Imola (1672–1694).

Biography
Costanzo Zani was born in Rome, Italy in 1622 and ordained a priest in the Order of Saint Benedict.
On 12 Sep 1672, he was appointed during the papacy of Pope Clement X as Bishop of Imola.
On 18 Sep 1672, he was consecrated bishop by Cesare Facchinetti, Bishop of Spoleto. 
He served as Bishop of Imola until his death on 16 Jun 1694.

Episcopal succession
While bishop, he was the principal co-consecrator of:

References

External links and additional sources
 (for Chronology of Bishops) 
 (for Chronology of Bishops) 

17th-century Italian Roman Catholic bishops
Bishops appointed by Pope Clement X
1622 births
1694 deaths